William Symes Andrews (September 10, 1847 – July 1, 1929) was an Edison Pioneer, electrical engineer, and one of the first employees of the General Electric Company.

Biography
He was born in England in 1847. He started working at Edison's Menlo Park in 1879. He died on July 1, 1929 in Schenectady, New York.

References

Edison Pioneers
1847 births
1929 deaths
English electrical engineers
American electrical engineers